The Manchester Spartans were an  American football club in Manchester, England. Founded in 1983 as the Northwich Spartans, they became Manchester Spartans in 1984, and were national champions in 1989 and 1990. They won the Eurobowl in 1990.

History

Formation and early seasons
The second oldest civilian team in Britain, Formed by Bernard McDerra they began as the Northwich Spartans in 1983 and came to Manchester a year later. In 1985, the first season of formally organized leagues in the U.K, the Spartans under George Aguado finished first in the Northern Division of the American Football League with a 10-2 record but lost to their neighbours Manchester Allstars in the first round of the playoffs. In 1986 they again finished with a 10-2 record and this time won their first round playoff only to suffer a 35-7 defeat to Birmingham Bulls in the British American Football League semi-final playoffs. In 1988 they won more games than any other team in one season (15), but fell in the playoffs semifinals.

First National Championship win
In 1989 player and coach, Terry Smith - who also coached GB at the time), they won the 1989 Budweiser title where they defeated Birmingham Bulls 21-14.

Under former Atlanta Falcons starter Roy Harris, the defense produced youngsters the calibre of LB's Martin Owen and Dave Egan and linemen Rick Hughes, Keith Marsh and Warren Billingham

Second National Championship win
In 1990 they were National Champions for the second time, NDMA Coke Bowl I, Manchester Spartans 27-25 Northants Storm.

Champions of Europe
As the Champions of Great Britain, the Spartans entered the European Football League tournament in 1990 against the national champions from each of the other European countries. The final championship game was called the Eurobowl.
In the European Championships, the Spartans defeated the Dublin Celts, the champions of Ireland, 28-14 in the Final 16 Round played in Dublin, Ireland.
Then, in the European Quarter-Final, the Spartans defeated the Amsterdam Crusaders, the champions of the Netherlands, 25-20 in a game played in England.
In the European Semi-Final, the Spartans defeated the Berlin Adler, the champions of the German Football League, 35-33, in a game played in Italy.
Then, in the European Final Eurobowl, the Spartans fell behind 14-0 in the first quarter against the Legnano Frogs, the champions of Italian Football League.  
However, the Spartans made some strategic adjustments, and the Spartans dominated the rest of the way as they came back to score 34 straight points to defeat Legnano 34-22 in the European Championship Game played in Rimini, Italy.
By winning the European Championship, the Manchester Spartans became the first team in Great Britain history to ever win the Eurobowl Championship.  
In fact, prior to the Spartans’ European Championship win, no team from Great Britain had ever even won a single game in European competition, which made the Spartans’ winning the entire European Championship even more of an amazing achievement for both the Spartans team and for Great Britain as a country.

Head coaches

1984-1985 - George Aguado

1988-1990 - Terry Smith

1991 - Nigel Dias

1992 - Terry Smith

1993 - Terry Smith

Great Britain Spartans
Renamed Great Britain Spartans in 1994 after moving to Sheffield, the club took part in the only Football League of Europe

Notable former players and Internationals

Adewybo.I - offense captain, WR

Egan.D - defense captain, MLB

Boyle.B - special teams captain, KK

Robinson.S - Running-Back

Lorenzo Walker - Running Back, brother of NFL running back and Heisman Trophy winner Herschel Walker

Hazen Choates - Quarterback, played at Boise State

Terry Smith - Played for the New England Patriots in the NFL prior to England, was the Spartans Player/Head Coach, Wide receiver and Free Safety.  Smith was also the Head Coach of the Great Britain National Team, coaching Great Britain to its first European Nations Championship in 1989.

Roy Harris - Also played for the Atlanta Falcons in the NFL, DL 

Frackelton, Derek - Liverpool born -Played for Northwich Spartans then Manchester Spartans from their first training session in 1982. Played Defensive Cornerback and Special teams kicker. Kicked off the first ever game between two UK squads, Manchester Spartans and London Ravens in Oct 1983. Was one of two sets of brothers in the Spartans side with brother Brian and the two Manchester brothers Ian and Ernest Obeng.

Internationals

John Parker, Trevor Woolley, Cameron Dundas, Mike Smith, Martin Owen, Nigel Dias, Howard Cooper

Les Jackson, Dave Samuels, Steve Leatham, Mike Taylor, Errol Taylor, Leeroy Innes, Sean Mason, Neil Pearson

Paul Bailey, Dave Egan, Gladstone McKenzie, Tim Casey, Bob Gaisie, Phil Wood, Jim Mitchell-Taylor

Allan Brown, Clifton Mitchell, Joe Richardson, Les Tuitt

Mike Astle, Lorenzo Walker

Mike Carruba, Curtis Bell, Manny Johnson, Dan Brooks, Hazen Choates, Terry Smith

Titles 
National Champions of Great Britain : 1989, 1990
Eurobowl: 1990

Refs 

 
Sport in Manchester
American football teams in England
1983 establishments in England
American football teams established in 1983
1993 disestablishments in England
Sports clubs disestablished in 1993